Kim Il-woo (born May 24, 1953 – June 13, 2004) was a South Korean actor. A veteran actor, Kim died of gastric cancer at the age of 49 on June 13, 2004.

Filmography 
(Note: List is incomplete)

Films

Television series

Awards and nominations

References

External links 
 
 
 

1953 births
2004 deaths
South Korean male television actors
South Korean male film actors